Lucas John Raley (born September 19, 1994) is an American professional baseball outfielder for the Tampa Bay Rays of Major League Baseball (MLB). He made his MLB debut in 2021 for the Los Angeles Dodgers.

Amateur career
Raley graduated from Highland High School in Medina, Ohio. He was named to the Ohio All-State Baseball Team as a senior. After going undrafted out of high school, he enrolled at Lake Erie College, where he played college baseball. In 2014, he briefly played collegiate summer baseball for the Bourne Braves of the Cape Cod Baseball League. As a junior at Lake Erie, he hit .424 with 12 home runs, 39 RBIs, and a .528 on-base percentage in 47 games. After his junior year, he was drafted by the Los Angeles Dodgers in the seventh round of the 2016 MLB draft, and he signed for $150,000.

Professional career

Los Angeles Dodgers
After signing, Raley was assigned to the Arizona League Dodgers. After batting .625 in five games, was promoted to the Ogden Raptors, and after batting .417 in five games with Ogden, he was promoted to the Great Lakes Loons. He finished the season with Great Lakes batting .245 with two home runs and 17 RBIs in 56 games. In 2017, Raley played for the Rancho Cucamonga Quakes where he slashed .295/.375/.473 with 14 home runs and 62 RBIs in 123 games and was named a California League All-Star. He began 2018 with the Tulsa Drillers, being selected to the Texas League All-Star Game.

Minnesota Twins
On July 31, 2018, Raley was traded to the Minnesota Twins, along with Devin Smeltzer and Logan Forsythe for Brian Dozier. He was assigned to the Chattanooga Lookouts and finished the season there. In 120 total games between Tulsa and Chattanooga, he hit .275 with twenty home runs and 69 RBIs. He spent 2019 with the Rochester Red Wings, playing in only 33 games due to injury and hitting .302/.362/.516/.878 with seven home runs and 21 RBIs. He played for the Salt River Rafters of the Arizona Fall League following the 2019 season. Raley was added to the Twins 40-man roster on November 20, 2019.

Return to the Dodgers
On February 10, 2020, the Twins traded Raley, Brusdar Graterol and the 67th pick in the 2020 Major League Baseball draft to the Dodgers for Kenta Maeda, Jaír Camargo and cash considerations. He did not play a minor league game in 2020 due to the cancellation of the minor league season caused by the COVID-19 pandemic. On April 9, 2021, Raley was promoted to the major leagues for the first time. He made his MLB debut that night as a defensive replacement in right field in the eighth inning. In his first at-bat, he grounded out to first base against Sam Clay of the Washington Nationals. His first career hit came on April 14, an opposite-field double against Daniel Bard of the Colorado Rockies. On April 16, Raley hit his first career home run off of Dan Altavilla of the San Diego Padres. He appeared in 33 games for the Dodgers during the season, hitting .182 with two home runs and four RBI. He also appeared in 72 games for the Triple-A Oklahoma City Dodgers, hitting .294 with 19 homers and 69 RBI. He struck out in his one at-bat in the Wild Card Game, his first post-season appearance.

Tampa Bay Rays
On March 18, 2022, Raley was traded to the Tampa Bay Rays in exchange for Tanner Dodson. Raley began the 2022 season with the Durham Bulls, where he batted .299/.374/.575 with 7 home runs and 25 RBIs in 24 games. He was promoted to the major league roster on June 21, 2022, following injuries to Kevin Kiermaier and Manuel Margot.

References

External links

Living people
1994 births
People from Hinckley, Ohio
Baseball players from Ohio
Major League Baseball outfielders
Arizona League Dodgers players
Bourne Braves players
Chattanooga Lookouts players
Durham Bulls players
Great Lakes Loons players
Gulf Coast Twins players
Lake Erie Storm baseball players
Los Angeles Dodgers players
Ogden Raptors players
Oklahoma City Dodgers players
Rancho Cucamonga Quakes players
Rochester Red Wings players
Salt River Rafters players
Tampa Bay Rays players
Tulsa Drillers players
Lakeshore Chinooks players